My Little Pony: Equestria Girls – Rainbow Rocks, known simply as Rainbow Rocks, is a 2014 flash animated fantasy musical movie based on Hasbro's Equestria Girls toy line and media franchise, which is a spin-off of the 2010 relaunch of My Little Pony. The movie was directed by Jayson Thiessen and Ishi Rudell and written by Meghan McCarthy and was produced by DHX Media's 2D animation studio in Vancouver, Canada for Hasbro Studios in the United States, as a sequel to the original Equestria Girls movie (2013). The movie premiered in select theaters across the United States and Canada on September 27, 2014, which was followed by broadcast on Discovery Family, a joint venture between Discovery, Inc. and Hasbro, on October 17, 2014, and then a home media release on October 28, 2014.

Like the first movie, Rainbow Rocks re-envisions the main characters of the parent franchise, normally ponies, as teenage human characters in a high school setting. Set between the fourth and fifth seasons of My Little Pony: Friendship Is Magic, the movie's plot involves Twilight Sparkle returning to Canterlot High School in the parallel world to compete in a Battle of the Bands alongside the human counterparts of her friends – including former school bully and former student of Princess Celestia Sunset Shimmer – to save the school from a trio of sirens from Equestria.

The movie was well received by critics, who described it as "far superior" to the first installment. It was followed by two sequels, My Little Pony: Equestria Girls - Friendship Games and My Little Pony: Equestria Girls - Legend of Everfree.

Plot 
Former Canterlot High School bully and student of Princess Celestia, Sunset Shimmer, who has reformed after being defeated by the magic of Twilight Sparkle's crown, is ostracized by most of the school despite her efforts to atone. Her only friends are the counterparts of: Rainbow Dash, Applejack, Pinkie Pie, Fluttershy and Rarity, who have formed a rock band called "the Rainbooms" to participate in the school's upcoming musical showcase. The five girls discover that the magic left over from Twilight's crown has given them the ability to grow pony-like ears, tails, and wings when they play their instruments.

Hoping to make a fresh impression, Sunset gives a school tour to three new students – Adagio Dazzle, Aria Blaze, and Sonata Dusk – and informs them of the showcase, unaware that they possess magical powers. Calling themselves "the Dazzlings", the trio performs a song that turns the other students aggressive and competitive towards one another, convincing them to turn the showcase into a battle of the bands. Sunset and her friends are protected from the song by their magic, but fail to convince Principal Celestia and Vice Principal Luna of the danger. Sunset remembers a magical book kept by Princess Celestia, her mentor from Equestria, which she uses to send a message requesting Twilight's help.

Receiving Sunset's message, Twilight deduces that the Dazzlings are sirens from Equestria that feed on negative emotions to fuel their singing powers for their goal of world conquest. Twilight uses the book's magic to reactivate the portal, allowing her and Spike to return to the parallel world. Twilight and the girls attempt to lift the Sirens' spell, but it takes no effect. Concluding that they must perform a musical counter-spell, the girls enter the battle of the bands to give Twilight time to complete the spell. The Rainbooms face hostility and sabotage from the other bands throughout the competition, which raises tensions among themselves

Desperate for time in the semi-final round against Trixie's band, Rainbow Dash performs an egotistical song to substitute the counter-spell and unknowingly nearly transforms. Sunset impulsively ruins her performance to keep her from exposing their plan to the Sirens, which angers the girls. The Sirens intervene to allow the Rainbooms' advancement to the final round anyway, which prompts a jealous Trixie to trap the Rainbooms beneath the stage to take their place. The girls enter a five-way argument (Rarity over Applejack not caring about her costume ideas for the band, Fluttershy over Rainbow Dash taking all the credit for the band and not playing any songs that she wrote, and Pinkie Pie because being in the band isn't fun at all), allowing the Sirens to absorb their magic. Realizing that their constant fighting is interfering with the counter-spell, Sunset convinces the girls to resolve their differences, while Twilight reasons that playing together as friends will make the counter-spell work.

Spike rescues the girls with assistance from DJ Pon-3, whose headphones' music protects her from the Sirens' spell. DJ Pon-3 provides a sound system that the Rainbooms use to engage the Sirens in a musical battle. Overwhelmed by the Sirens, the Rainbooms are joined by Sunset and with her help, the Rainbooms destroy the Sirens' pendants, the sources of their powers, leading to the Sirens being booed offstage. Afterward, Twilight and Spike return to Equestria, while Sunset uses Celestia's book to remain in contact with Twilight.

During the credits, Sunset is seen having now been accepted by the rest of the school. In a post-credits scene, the human world's version of Twilight is shown investigating the strange magical activity around Canterlot High.

Cast 

 Tara Strong as Princess Twilight Sparkle, a studious "alicorn" (winged unicorn) and one of the princesses of Equestria. She serves as the temporary lead vocalist of the Rainbooms, a band formed by the counterparts of her pony friends.
 Strong also voices Twilight's counterpart in the alternate universe in a post-credits scene.
 Ashleigh Ball as:
 Rainbow Dash, the lead guitarist and founder of the Rainbooms, and the lead vocalist.
 Applejack, the Rainbooms' bassist. 
 Their counterparts in Equestria as depicted in Friendship Is Magic, also voiced by Ball, also appear in the movie.
 Andrea Libman as:
 Pinkie Pie, the Rainbooms' drummer.
 Fluttershy, who plays the tambourine on the Rainbooms.
 Their counterparts in Equestria, also voiced by Libman, also appear in the movie.
 Shannon Chan-Kent performs Pinkie's singing voice.
 Tabitha St. Germain as:
 Rarity, the Rainbooms' keytarist.
 Vice Principal Luna, the vice-principal of Canterlot High and Principal Celestia's younger sister.
 Photo Finish, a German-accented student.
 Rarity's counterpart in Equestria, also voiced by St. Germain, appears in the movie.
 Cathy Weseluck as Spike, Twilight's dragon assistant who assumes the form of a dog in the parallel world.
 His ordinary dog counterpart, vocal effects by Frank Welker, also appears in the post-credits scene.
 Rebecca Shoichet as Sunset Shimmer, a unicorn from Equestria and reformed school bully at Canterlot High who befriends the Rainbooms.
 Shoichet also performs Twilight's singing voice.
 Kazumi Evans as: 
Adagio Dazzle, the leader of the power-hungry sirens from Equestria and the lead vocalist of the Dazzlings.
 Evans also performs Rarity's singing voice.
 Octavia Melody, a student who plays the cello.
 Marÿke Hendrikse as Sonata Dusk, an airheaded siren and backing vocalist of the Dazzlings.
 Madeline Merlo performs Sonata's singing voice.
 Diana Kaarina as Aria Blaze, a temperamental siren and backing vocalist of the Dazzlings.
 Shylo Sharity performs Aria's singing voice.
 Vincent Tong as Flash Sentry, a student infatuated with Twilight who plays against her as the guitarist of a rival band, Flash Drive.
 Kathleen Barr as Trixie, a magician and guitarist of another rival band, Trixie and the Illusions.
 Nicole Oliver as Principal Celestia, the principal of Canterlot High and Vice Principal Luna's older sister.
 The counterpart of DJ Pon-3 appears prominently in the movie.
 Michelle Creber as Apple Bloom, Applejack's younger sister.
 Ingrid Nilson as Maud Pie, Pinkie Pie's older sister.
 Peter New as Big Mac, Applejack & Apple Bloom's older brother.
 Lee Tockar as Snips, a student who is in a rap duo with Snails, under his stage name MC Snips.
 Richard Ian Cox as Snails, a student who is in a rap duo with Snips, under his stage name DJ Snazzy Snails.
 Brian Drummond as Delivery Pony, a pony in Equestria who was delivering books to the Castle of Friendship from Canterlot.

Production 
On February 13, 2014, Meghan McCarthy wrote on Twitter that she had worked on the movie during the summer of 2013. The movie's opening credits were storyboarded by Tony Cliff. The storybook illustration depictions of the sirens in Equestria were done by Rebecca Dart. The illustrations shown during the ending credits were drawn by Katrina Hadley.

In the audio commentary included in-home media releases, McCarthy commented that Equestria Girls was initially not intended to become an ongoing franchise and the thought of a sequel did not cross her mind. Additionally, Sunset did not become the main character until the second draft of the script. The DVD commentary also points out that the midnight snack scene between Twilight and Sunset was added late into the movie's production, and Rarity's line " we forgive you for your past...ahem...booboos" was ad-libbed by St. Germain and the freestyle rap by Snips and Snails' counterparts was genuine freestyling by Tockar and Ian Cox.

Music 

On February 13, 2014, songwriter Daniel Ingram wrote on Twitter that there will be a total of 12 songs in the movie, the greatest number of songs featured in a Friendship Is Magic episode or Equestria Girls movie thus far; however, only 11 songs made it in the movie.

Like in Equestria Girls, the songs were composed by Ingram with lyric writing shared between Ingram and screenwriter Meghan McCarthy; except "Rainbow Rocks" and "Shine Like Rainbows", which had lyrics by Ingram; "Bad Counter Spell" and "Under Our Spell" by McCarthy and "Shake Your Tail" having the first draft by the writer Amy Keating Rogers, in which Ingram later revised. Trevor Hoffman provided the arrangements for the songs and musician Caleb Chan produced the songs as well as playing guitar and bass.
 "Rainbow Rocks" – The Rainbooms (voiceover)
 "Better Than Ever" – The Rainbooms 
 "Battle" – The Dazzlings and students
 "Bad Counter Spell" – Twilight Sparkle
 "Shake Your Tail" – The Rainbooms
 "Under Our Spell" – The Dazzlings
 "Tricks Up My Sleeve" – Trixie and the Illusions
 "Awesome as I Wanna Be" – Rainbow Dash and the Rainbooms
 "Welcome to the Show" – The Rainbooms, Sunset Shimmer, The Dazzlings, and students
 "Rainbooms Battle" – Instrumental
 "End Credits Song: Shine Like Rainbows" – The Rainbooms

Release

Marketing 
On July 24, 2014, a movie clip and a teaser trailer were released on Yahoo! TV. On September 10, 2014, through the Equestria Daily fan news blog, Shout! Factory revealed a 30-second trailer. Two days later on September 12, a 50-second trailer was released on YouTube. Six days later on September 18, a full theatrical trailer was released also via Yahoo! TV; the trailer was then uploaded to Hasbro's YouTube channel four days later on September 22. These trailers had no classification card from the MPAA, even for the United States screenings.

Theatrical 
The movie received a limited theatrical release on September 27, 2014, in the United States through Screenvision theaters and in Canada through Cineplex theaters. It also received a "Purple Carpet" premiere at the TCL Chinese Theatre in Hollywood, which was attended by the cast and crew as well as some celebrities such as Jamie Foxx, Modern Family actress Ariel Winter and Academy Award nominee Quvenzhané Wallis. Like the first movie, the screenings of Rainbow Rocks in the United States bore no classification from the MPAA (which is not mandatory, although many theaters carried a G-rating), while the Canadian screenings had classifications from provincial movie boards (usually G).

In the United Kingdom, the movie was theatrically released on October 25 and 26, 2014. The movie was theatrically released on November 15, 2014, in Australia.

Home media 
The movie was released on DVD and Blu-ray by Shout! Factory on October 28, 2014 in Region 1. Special features include: a new featurette, the eight prelude animated shorts, a sing-along song and an audio commentary on the movie by Thiessen, Rudell, McCarthy, Hasbro Studios vice president of development Michael Vogel and Hasbro's executive director Brian Lenard. There were also three store exclusives for the United States release of the DVD: The Target edition included a bracelet, a USD $4 coupon for one My Little Pony toy and the DVD of the first Equestria Girls movie; The Walmart edition included a music CD, a digital copy of the movie and the same $4 coupon; The Kmart edition included a "backstage pass" and the coupon. The initial production run of the DVD contained an error that caused chapters 5 and 6 to play in reverse order when the movie was viewed using the "Play" option on the main menu.

A Region 2 Rainbow Rocks DVD from distributor Primal Screen Entertainment was released on March 23, 2015, for various countries including: France, Germany, Italy, the Middle East region, the Netherlands and the United Kingdom.

Alongside Equestria Girls and Friendship Games, this movie was released in a box set on October 13, 2015, in Region 1.

Television 
Rainbow Rocks made its United States television premiere on Discovery Family (a joint venture between Discovery, Inc. and Hasbro) on October 17, 2014. The movie premiered on the Family Channel in Canada on November 8, 2014. In the United Kingdom, it premiered on Pop on December 24, 2014.

Merchandise and other media 

The movie is a part of music-themed Rainbow Rocks lineup, a second installment in the My Little Pony: Equestria Girls toy line and media franchise, which was first displayed at the 2014 American International Toy Fair. LB Kids published two novelizations of the movie, all written by Perdita Finn. A Rainbow Rocks missile command-type mini-game was added to the Hasbro Arcade mobile app on April 8, 2014. An issue of IDW's Fiendship Is Magic features the sirens.

Animated shorts

Prelude 

On February 13, 2014, Entertainment Weekly released the first trailer; about four months later, however, McCarthy confirmed on her Twitter post that the clips from that trailer "are separate shorts and not scenes in the movie." A series of eight animated shorts was released on Hasbro Studio's YouTube channel in 2014 from March 27 to June 19 to promote the movie. The shorts were created by the Friendship Is Magic crew to tie into the movie and are considered "prequels" to the movie's events, detailing how each of them discovered that they could awaken Equestrian magic within them by playing their respective instruments.

The first eight shorts made their television debut on Discovery Family on May 30, 2015.

Encore 
With lyric collaboration between Thiessen, Vogel, Lenard, Katrina Hadley, and Daniel Ingram and songs composed by Ingram, Hasbro released three Rainbow Rocks music videos on March 31, 2015: "Friendship Through the Ages", "Life Is a Runway" and "My Past is Not Today"; but were reuploaded two days later on April 2, 2015. These shorts are separate initiatives that lead up to the third Equestria Girls movie installment, Friendship Games. On April 6, 2015, Ingram replied in a comment on Facebook that these will likely be on the next Equestria Girls album in late 2015. On September 17, 2015, the encore shorts were released as the first three audio tracks on the My Little Pony Equestria Girls: The Friendship Games soundtrack.

Soundtrack 
The movie's soundtrack was released on September 10, 2014 via the ITunes Store. Announced on Ingram's Twitter eight days later on September 18 (chart of September 27), the soundtrack placed #15 on the Kid Albums Billboard chart; two weeks later on October 2 (chart of October 11, 2014), the soundtrack placed #12; a week later on October 18, it placed #10.

Reception

Box office 
In Hasbro's Q3 2014 Earnings Report, it was revealed that the box office returns from this movie exceeded that of the first movie in the first weekend by 37%. On a per-theater basis, sales for tickets grew by 19% in the first three weeks of its limited theatrical run. The movie grossed $360,736 in its limited time in theaters in the United Kingdom, Finland, Mexico, United Arab Emirates and Uruguay.

Television viewership 
When the main feature premiered on Discovery Family on October 17, 2014, it was viewed by approximately 610,000 viewers.

When the first eight Rainbow Rocks shorts made their television debut on Discovery Family on May 30, 2015, they were viewed by approximately 299,000 viewers.

Critical response 
My Little Pony: Equestria Girls – Rainbow Rocks was well received by critics and fans. Sherilyn Connelly for The Village Voice called Rainbow Rocks "far superior" to the first Equestria Girls movie and that while "the picture is continuity-heavy and not particularly accessible to newcomers", that the movie was "up there with the show at its most thoughtful".  Sheri Linden of The Hollywood Reporter complimented the movie, saying "Though it's strictly for the faithful, the tween-friendly mix of cute and earnest has a forthright sharpness and is never cloying." Shane O'Hare of Geekscape gave the Blu-ray of the movie a score of 4 out of 5, praising the soundtrack stating "The show's composer, Daniel Ingram,...killed it. 10 all new original recordings from Daniel really stole the show." Ed Liu of Toon Zone, who gave the first movie a mixed review, also found this movie to be better.  He wrote the movie "is almost as sweet and charming as the best episodes of the series, finding new and interesting ways to expand on the show's themes of friendship."

"Gerry O", 12-year-old movie critic for The Huffington Post's Kids First! called the movie "a combination of adventure with a crème of comedy and a sprinkle of excitement all  up in a friendship sandwich."

In 2017, IGN named the movie among the "Best Kids Movies Streaming on Netflix".

References

External links 

 
 
 

My Little Pony: Equestria Girls
2014 films
2014 computer-animated films
2010s American animated films
2010s children's comedy films
2010s children's fantasy films
2010s musical fantasy films
2010s musical comedy films
American children's animated adventure films
American children's animated comedy films
American children's animated fantasy films
American musical fantasy films
American children's animated musical films
American fantasy adventure films
American musical comedy films
American sequel films
American flash animated films
Canadian animated fantasy films
Canadian children's fantasy films
Canadian musical fantasy films
Canadian sequel films
Canadian animated feature films
English-language Canadian films
2010s fantasy adventure films
Films about princesses
Films about shapeshifting
Films about parallel universes
Animated films based on classical mythology
Film spin-offs
Equestria Girls films
Hasbro Studios films
Films directed by Jayson Thiessen
DHX Media films
Magical girl films
Animated crossover television specials
2014 comedy films
Sirens (mythology)
2010s English-language films
2010s Canadian films